Anas Serrhat is a Moroccan professional footballer who plays as a midfielder for Wydad AC.

Career
He started his career playing for DH Jadida and Renaissance Zemamra, before joining Wydad AC in 2020.

References

1996 births
Living people
Moroccan footballers
Wydad AC players
Association football midfielders
Renaissance Club Athletic Zemamra players